Jarosławiec (formerly ) is a village in the administrative district of Gmina Postomino, within Sławno County, West Pomeranian Voivodeship, in north-western Poland. It is located on the Slovincian Coast in the historic region of Pomerania.

The village has a population of 329.

Panorama Morska
The Health resort & Medical  SPA "Panorama Morska" in Jarosławiec is a recreational compound with an area of 10 hectares. Situated approximately 350 metres from one of the most beautiful beaches of the Polish Coast, it offers more than 400 modern rooms with private bathrooms. The biggest attraction is a large water park open all year - external swimming pool complex with hot water and sun loungers.

References

Villages in Sławno County
Populated coastal places in Poland
Seaside resorts in Poland